Caloptilia ariana is a moth of the family Gracillariidae. It is known from India, Indonesia (Sulawesi), Japan (Ryukyu Islands, Kyūshū), Malaysia (Sabah), Sri Lanka and Thailand.

The wingspan is 10–13 mm.

The larvae feed on Helicia cochinchinensis. They probably mine the leaves of their host plant.

References

ariana
Moths of Asia
Moths described in 1914